Antharmostes is a genus of moths in the family Geometridae first described by Warren in 1899.

Species
Some species of this genus are:
Antharmostes alcaea L. B. Prout, 1930
Antharmostes dargei Herbulot, 1982
Antharmostes interalbicans Warren, 1902
Antharmostes marginata (Warren, 1897)
Antharmostes mesoleuca Warren, 1899
Antharmostes orinophragma Prout, 1930
Antharmostes papilio Prout, 1912
Antharmostes reducta Herbulot, 1996
Antharmostes simplicimargo Prout, 1917
Antharmostes sufflata Herbulot, 1982
Antharmostes tutsiana Herbulot, 1996

References
 

Geometrinae
Geometridae genera